Valerie Curtis-Newton is an American artistic director. Newton is head of Performance – Acting and Directing at the University of Washington School of Drama and Artistic Director for The Hansberry Project.

Recognition 
Her awards include: 

 2012 Gypsy Award for Excellence in Direction; 
 2014, the Stranger Genius Awards in Performance and the Crosscut Courage Award for Culture; 
 2016, The Seattle Times Footlight Award for ‘Best in Show’ 
 2017 the Artist Trust Innovator Award in 2017. 

Her fellowships include:

 Gielgud Directing Fellowship: NEA/TCG Career Development Fellowship for Directors (1997-1999);  
 Stage Directors and Choreographers Foundation's (SDCF) in 2001.

References

Living people
Year of birth missing (living people)
American artistic directors